Janet Wesonga, née Tingu (born c.1928) was a Ugandan local politician. As mayor of Mbale, she was Uganda's first African woman mayor. An Anglican, she also served on the Executive Committee of the World Council of Churches.

Life
Janet Tingu came from Buwabwala. She married Akisoferi Wesonga, later Bishop of Mbale.

In 1962 she was active in the Ugandan independence movement. 

In October 1967, aged 39, Wesonga became mayor of Mbale, Uganda. She was Mayor of Mbale for four years. 

At the 1968 Assembly of the World Council of Churches (WCC) in Uppsala, Wesonga was elected as one of only two women on the WCC's Executive Committee. This enabled her to participate in WCC activity across the globe. In 1969 Wesonga attended a WCC Executive Committee Meeting in Tulsa, Oklahoma, later also visiting St. Louis, Missouri. In 1971 she attended the WCC Executive Committee meeting in Sofia, Bulgaria.

In 1979 Wesonga was part of a delegation representing the Church of Uganda at the Mother's Union conference in Australia.

References

Mayors of places in Uganda
Women mayors of places in Uganda
1920s births
Living people
Ugandan Anglicans
People of the World Council of Churches
Mbale
20th-century Ugandan women politicians
20th-century Ugandan politicians